Oxford Studies in Ancient Philosophy is a peer-reviewed academic journal devoted to the study of ancient philosophy.  The journal is indexed by PhilPapers and the Philosopher's Index.  Each volume however is assigned an ISBN on its own, and the volumes have been described as being rather more like an anthology than a journal issue.

Oxford Studies in Ancient Philosophy was started in 1983 by Julia Annas.  At the time of its founding, it was commended as a supplement or even rival to the journal Phronesis. It was also criticized for using transliterations of the ancient Greek language texts rather than the original alphabet.  It is one of the major journals for ancient philosophy. The journal is published by Oxford University Press and the current editor is Victor Caston at the University of Michigan.  Apart from Annas, previous editors were Brad Inwood, C. C. W. Taylor and David Sedley.

Notes

External links

PhilPapers listing for Oxford Studies in Ancient Philosophy

Ancient philosophy journals
Publications established in 1983
Oxford University Press academic journals